The Pike29 Memorial Track is a hiking track located in Paparoa National Park in the South Island of New Zealand. The track is being created as a memorial for the 29 miners who lost lives in the Pike River Mine disaster. The track is part of the Paparoa Track, the tenth Great Walk created. Both tracks were originally scheduled to open in 2018. Whilst the Paparoa Track has been fully open since March 2020, the Pike29 Memorial Track is still under construction and expected to open in December 2022. A memorial and interpretation centre at the Pike River Mine portal is due to be finished in April 2024.

Track history 

In November 2010, a methane explosion at the Pike River Mine killed 29 men and entombed them. Family members of the men then worked with government and asked for a visitor centre to be built, and a new track built to Great Walks standard be constructed that linked the Pike River Mine site on the eastern side of the Paparoa Range with Punakaiki on the West Coast. This was to serve as a memorial but also as a source of income from tourism, compensating for the loss of income to the region of the mine. In his role as acting Conservation Minister, Nick Smith and family representatives announced on 29 January 2015 that the track would be built and that the land around the mine would be added to the existing Paparoa National Park. The Department of Conservation had been tasked with a feasibility study and prior to that work having been completed, it was estimated that a  track would be built. Some families regard the area as sacred and maintain that people should not cycle or walk across the mine site; they were opposed to the track construction. Smith confirmed the track on 15 November 2015, confirmed that it would go from Blackball to Punakaiki, and that  of new track would be built. It would connect existing tracks—the Croesus Track and the Pororari River Track—and a side track would be built to the Pike River Mine site. At the mine, a visitor centre and a memorial were to be built. It was confirmed that the main track could also be used for year-round mountain biking, which is unusual for National Parks but was favoured by the family group to maximise the tourism potential for the West Coast. It was announced that  would be added to the national park. Two 20-bunk huts on the Paparoa Track were part of the proposal. The arrangements were formalised in March 2017 through amending the Paparoa National Park Management Plan as construction activity in a National Park is otherwise not permitted. Track construction was to start later that autumn and the huts were to be started the following summer, with a construction budget of NZ$10m. The name of Paparoa Track was chosen by the family group of the deceased miners.

It was not until July 2017 (i.e. winter) that construction did start, as announced by Smith in mid-July 2017. The projected track opening had shifted to April 2019 by then. Three different companies were tasked with building sections of the overall project, with Nelmac Limited assigned to one section of the Paparoa Track (from the bushline above the Moonlight Tops Hut to the junction with the Pike29 Memorial Track) and the Pike29 Memorial Track.

After the change to Labour Government later in 2017, part of the tourism support package announced in December 2017 by the Minister of Tourism, Kelvin Davis, went to Blackball in support of the tracks under construction. 

The Paparoa Track was officially opened on 1 December 2019 and after a major slip had been repaired, the track was fully open on 1 March 2020. However, some time after the Pike River Recovery Agency was established, the contractor was removed from the Pike29 Memorial Track. The contractor returned in February 2022. The Pike29 Memorial Track and the access road to the Pike River Mine are due to open by Christmas 2022, while a memorial and interpretation centre at the mine portal is due to be finished in April 2024.

Footnotes

References

External links

 Paparoa Track and Pike29 Memorial Track, Department of Conservation

Grey District
Hiking and tramping tracks in the West Coast, New Zealand
Paparoa National Park
Articles containing video clips